William Amaral de Andrade (born 27 December 1967), known simply as William, is a Brazilian former professional footballer who played as a central defender, and is currently assistant manager of Atlético Nacional in Colombia.

Playing career
William was born in Rio de Janeiro. During his extensive career he played most notably for S.L. Benfica, from where he arrived in 1990 after spells at two other Portuguese clubs, C.D. Nacional and Vitória de Guimarães.

During his five-year spell, William helped Benfica to two Primeira Liga titles, forming an efficient partnership with compatriot Ricardo Gomes after arriving as a replacement for another Brazilian, Carlos Mozer. In the 1990–91 season he did not miss one single game for the champions, and still scored four goals.

After one season in France at SC Bastia, William moved to Spain with SD Compostela, being fairly used during four years (although he was never an automatic first-choice), two in La Liga and two in the second division. He then returned to Portugal and Vitória Guimarães, already the bearer of a passport from the country, and retired after two slow years in June 2002, aged nearly 35.

Coaching career
From December 2004 to May 2005 with SC Valenciano, and during one month in 2012 with Vilaverdense FC, William worked in the Portuguese third level. He subsequently had two spells with former club Compostela, who now competed in the regional championships.

In 2016, William was named head coach of newly promoted Gibraltar Premier Division side Mons Calpe, appointing Gibraltar under-19 manager Terrence Jolley as his assistant and overseeing the arrivals of former professionals including Hugo Colace and Michele Di Piedi. On 17 January 2017, following a defeat against Glacis United, he was fired. After a brief return to the club in 2019, he was appointed manager of Lincoln Red Imps in May 2020. On 5 October 2020, the club confirmed William's departure.

On 13 October 2022, William was appointed assistant coach of Paulo Autuori at Colombian club Atlético Nacional.

Honours
Benfica
Primeira Liga: 1990–91, 1993–94
Taça de Portugal: 1992–93

References

External links

1967 births
Living people
Footballers from Rio de Janeiro (city)
Brazilian footballers
Association football defenders
Campeonato Brasileiro Série A players
Botafogo de Futebol e Regatas players
Primeira Liga players
Liga Portugal 2 players
C.D. Nacional players
Vitória S.C. players
S.L. Benfica footballers
Ligue 1 players
SC Bastia players
La Liga players
Segunda División players
SD Compostela footballers
Mons Calpe S.C. managers
Lincoln Red Imps F.C. managers
Gibraltar National League managers
Brazilian expatriate footballers
Expatriate footballers in Portugal
Expatriate footballers in France
Expatriate footballers in Spain
Brazilian expatriate sportspeople in Portugal
Brazilian expatriate sportspeople in France
Brazilian expatriate sportspeople in Spain
Brazilian football managers
SD Compostela managers
Brazilian expatriate football managers
Expatriate football managers in Portugal
Expatriate football managers in Spain
Expatriate football managers in Gibraltar